Paul Norman Wilson, Baron Wilson of High Wray   (24 October 1908 – 24 February 1980) was a British engineer, Lord Lieutenant of Westmorland (1965 to 1974) and of Cumbria (1974 to 1980) and Governor of the BBC.

Early life
The younger son of Norman Forster Wilson, CE, of Kendal, Westmorland, and of Mrs H. G. M. Wilson (née Harris), Wilson was educated at Gresham's School, Holt, and Clare College, Cambridge.

Career
Wilson began his career as an engineer in South Africa, working there between 1930 and 1934. He then joined Gilbert Gilkes & Gordon Ltd, water turbine manufacturers, as managing director, in his home town of Kendal. He served the Second World War of 1939–1945 with the Royal Naval Volunteer Reserve, most of that time being spent at sea in capital ships. He was awarded the Distinguished Service Cross and retired as a temporary Lieutenant-Commander, to return to Gilbert Gilkes & Gordon. He was chairman of the company from 1954 to 1978.

In 1950 and 1951, he stood as Labour Party General Election candidate for his home constituency of Westmorland but lost on both occasions.

In public life, Wilson became a justice of the peace in 1958 and a Deputy Lieutenant for Westmorland in 1964, later DL for Cumberland and Westmorland, and Lord Lieutenant of the newly created county of Cumbria, 1974 to 1980. He was a Governor of the BBC from 1968 to 1972, governor of Sedbergh School, 1965–1974, and chairman of governors of Kendal College of Further Education, 1958–1974. He served as chairman of the Kendal & District Local Employment Committee (1954–1969), a member of the Westmoreland Youth Employment Committee (1946–1969) and of the National Youth Employment Council (1959 to 1969). A member of the Advisory Council of the Science Museum, 1968–1972 and 1973–1978, he was also Chairman of the Fund for the Preservation of Technological and Scientific Material, 1973–1978. Chairman of Trustees and Governors of the Lake District Museum Trust, 1968–1978.

Honours
Distinguished Service Cross, 1945
Officer of the Order of the British Empire, 1959
Lord Lieutenant of Westmorland, 1965 to 1974
Knight of the Venerable Order of Saint John, 1966
Lord Lieutenant of Cumbria, 1974 to 1980
Created a life peer with the title Baron Wilson of High Wray, of Kendal in the County of Cumbria on 3 February 1976
President of the Newcomen Society, 1973–1975 (and vice-president, 1968–1973 and 1975–1977)
Patron of the Cumberland & Westmorland Antiquarian and Archaeological Society, 1965 (President, 1975–1978)
Deputy Chairman of the British Hydromechanics Research Association, 1973–1975

Major publications
Watermills, an introduction (1956, 2nd edn 1973)
Watermills with Horizontal Wheels (1960)
Water Turbines (Science Museum, 1974)
Water and other forms of Motive Power in History of Technology, 1900–1950 (1977)

References

External links

1908 births
1980 deaths
Alumni of Clare College, Cambridge
BBC Governors
Deputy Lieutenants of Cumberland
Deputy Lieutenants of Westmorland
Knights of the Order of St John
Wilson of High Wray
Lord-Lieutenants of Cumbria
Lord-Lieutenants of Westmorland
Officers of the Order of the British Empire
People educated at Gresham's School
People from Kendal
Royal Navy officers
People associated with the Science Museum, London
Life peers created by Elizabeth II